Metropolitan Cork is a semi-official term which refers to the city of Cork, Ireland, its suburbs, the rural hinterland that surrounds it, and a number of the towns and villages in that hinterland. Some of the latter towns and villages are within the administrative area of County Cork. 

The term Metropolitan Cork was used in the Cork Area Strategic Plan to refer to the area whose labour and property market is shared with the city. The plan declared that it was envisaged as an area with "an integrated transport system, and the social, cultural and educational facilities of a modern European city". Metropolitan Cork is the core employment hub of the "Greater Cork" area. The term is loosely defined but has been taken by authorities to include the city of Cork, its suburbs and the towns of Ballincollig, Blarney, Carrigaline, Carrigtwohill, Cobh, Douglas, Glanmire, Glounthaune, Midleton, Passage West and Ringaskiddy.

According to the Cork Area Transit System (CATS) Study Final Report of February 2010, at that time, the metropolitan area covered 820km2 and approximately 270,000 people.

By mid-2018, legislation was drafted to expand the boundary of Cork city, to include a number of the metropolitan area towns (such as Blarney and Carrigtwohill). This change proposed to bring much of "Metropolitan Cork" within the bounds of the Cork City Council area. On 31 May 2019, the boundary change came into force, with the city bounds being extended to include Ballincollig, Blarney, Glanmire, Rochestown, Grange and Cork Airport, and thereby increasing the city population from 125,000 to approximately 210,000.

Greater Cork
Greater Cork is an area that extends beyond Metropolitan Cork, and includes the Metropolitan Cork area (referred to in the regional planning guidelines as the "Cork Gateway"), plus Mallow and its hinterland, as well as the ring towns of Bandon, Fermoy, Kinsale, Macroom and Youghal. This Greater Cork area was recorded as having a population of 377,596 in 2006.

Population

References

 

Metropolitan areas of Ireland